James Melville "Mel" White (born June 26, 1940) is an American clergyman and author. White was a behind-the-scenes member of the Evangelical Protestant movement through the 1960s, 1970s, and 1980s, writing film and television specials and ghostwriting autobiographies for televangelists such as Jerry Falwell, Pat Robertson, and Billy Graham. After years of writing for the Christian right, he came out as gay in 1994 and devoted himself full-time to minister to lesbians, gays, bisexuals, and transgender people, also writing extensively on the subject of gay Christians.

Life and career
White was born in Santa Clara, California, the son of Faythe Alvera (Rear) and Olin "Carl" White. White graduated from Warner Pacific College and married Lyla Lee Loehr. They had two children, one of whom is the actor and filmmaker Mike White.

After receiving his BA from Warner Pacific College, then graduating with an MA in communications from the University of Portland, White followed with graduate work in communications and film at University of Southern California, UCLA, and Harvard. He received his Doctorate of Ministry from, and was a professor of communications and preaching for over a decade at Fuller Theological Seminary. During this time he also worked as an evangelical pastor.

After their marriage, White admitted to his wife that he had always been attracted to men. He embarked on a long process of attempted cures for his homosexuality, including psychotherapy, prayer, electroconvulsive therapy, and exorcism. None of these techniques changed his attraction to men, and after he attempted suicide, he and his wife agreed to an amicable divorce. His son Mike is bisexual.

In 1984, White began dating Gary Nixon. In 1994, White wrote his autobiography, Stranger at the Gate: To Be Gay And Christian In America, which detailed his former career in the Religious Right and his struggle coming to terms with his sexuality. His ex-wife wrote the foreword to this book. His latest book, Holy Terror: Lies the Christian Right Tells To Deny Gay Equality was released in hardback as Religion Gone Bad: Hidden Dangers from the Christian Right.

After coming out, White transferred his clergy credentials to the gay-affirming Metropolitan Community Church.

In 1997, White was awarded the American Civil Liberties Union's National Civil Liberties Award for his efforts to apply the "soul force" principles of Mahatma Gandhi and Martin Luther King Jr. to the struggle for justice for sexual minorities. He founded Soulforce, a gay advocacy group, in 1998.

On June 18, 2008, White and Nixon were the first same-sex couple legally married at All Saints Episcopal Church (Pasadena, California) following the May 16, 2008 action of the Supreme Court of California overturning the state's ban on same-sex marriage. They currently reside in Palm Springs, California.

Writings and works
White ghostwrote several books for fellow evangelicals, including Billy Graham (Approaching Hoofbeats), Pat Robertson (America's Date with Destiny), and Jerry Falwell (Strength for the Journey and If I Should Die Before I Wake).

Since 1993, he has devoted himself full-time to minister to lesbians, gays, bisexuals, and transgender people, working on their behalf in the media, in the political process, and with fellow religious leaders.

White's autobiography, Stranger at the Gate: To be Gay and Christian in America (1994), is still being read widely, especially by LGBTQ people, their families and friends struggling to reconcile faith with sexual orientation. White's latest book, Religion Gone Bad: Hidden Dangers from the Christian Right (2007), is called "A consciousness-raising, must-read book" by Bishop John Shelby Spong. It was reissued later in revised form with the title Holy Terror: Lies the Christian Right Tells Us to Deny Gay Equality.

He has produced, written, and directed 53 documentary films and television specials on spirituality.

He is also an author; among his 16 books (nine bestsellers), he wrote Aquino, a book about the Philippines' Ninoy and Corazon Aquino, Deceived about the Jonestown tragedy, David about David Rothenberg (a child burned by his father, later depicted in the film David), and Lust: The Other Side of Love.

He was talk-show host/producer in When the Going Gets Tough.

In popular culture
In 2009 White appeared on the fourteenth season of The Amazing Race along with his son Mike. The two completed  seven legs of the race before being eliminated in sixth place in Phuket, Thailand. The team subsequently participated in The Amazing Race: Unfinished Business, an edition featuring eleven returning teams. They were the second team eliminated and finished in 10th place in Yokosuka, Japan at the end of the third leg. Mel and Mike were eliminated after being hospitalized with hypothermia.

White is also a contributor to the DVD program Living the Questions, an introduction to Progressive Christianity. Dr. White is also featured in the documentary For the Bible Tells Me So.

The Cambodian NGO New Future for Children is supported by White.

Books and stories under his own name
 Sam Clemens and the Notable Mare (1993) (collected in Mike Resnick's alternate history anthology Alternate Warriors)

References

External links
 
 Mel White's GLBT organization
 Interview with Rev. Candace Chellew, Whosoever.org
 Mel White, New Future for Children, Cambodia
 

1940 births
Living people
American memoirists
American non-fiction writers
American pacifists
Fuller Theological Seminary alumni
Fuller Theological Seminary faculty
Harvard University alumni
LGBT Protestant clergy
American LGBT rights activists
Metropolitan Community Church clergy
People from Santa Clara, California
LGBT theologians
University of California, Los Angeles alumni
University of Portland alumni
University of Southern California alumni
The Amazing Race (American TV series) contestants
Warner Pacific University alumni
Activists from California
LGBT people from California